The 1985 Southern 500 was a NASCAR Winston Cup Series racing event that took place on September 1, 1985, at Darlington Raceway in Darlington, South Carolina. It was race number 20 of 28 of the 1985 NASCAR Winston Cup Series season. Bill Elliott made history by winning the race and with it the Winston Million bonus; it was then the richest single race payday in motorsports history.

Background

Darlington Raceway, nicknamed by many NASCAR fans and drivers as "The Lady in Black" or "The Track Too Tough to Tame", is a race track built for NASCAR racing located near Darlington, South Carolina. It is of a unique, somewhat egg-shaped design, an oval with the ends of very different configurations, altered to accommodate the resident landowner who didn’t want his nearby minnow pond disturbed. This situation makes it very challenging for the crews to set up their cars' handling in a way that will be effective at both ends.

The track is a four-turn  oval. The track's first two turns are banked at twenty-five degrees, while the final two turns are banked two degrees lower at twenty-three degrees. The front stretch (the location of the finish line) and the back stretch is banked at six degrees. Darlington Raceway can seat up to 60,000 people.

Darlington has something of a legendary quality among drivers and older fans; this is probably due to its long track length relative to other NASCAR speedways of its era and hence the first venue where many of them became cognizant of the truly high speeds that stock cars could achieve on a long track. The track allegedly earned the moniker The Lady in Black because the night before the race the track maintenance crew would cover the entire track with fresh asphalt sealant, in the early years of the speedway, thus making the racing surface dark black. Darlington is also known as "The Track Too Tough to Tame" because drivers can run lap after lap without a problem and then bounce off of the wall the following lap. Racers will frequently explain that they have to race the racetrack, not their competition. Drivers hitting the wall are considered to have received their "Darlington Stripe" thanks to the missing paint on the right side of the car.

Race Summary
Dale Earnhardt had the dominant car of the race but on lap 317 he spun which not only brought out the caution flag but also damaged his engine which led to him dropping out of the race. Cale Yarborough led until his car started billowing smoke from his power steering leading to one of the race's last caution flags leaving Bill Elliott in the lead and claiming the Winston Million.

This race was the first start for Pancho Carter and the last Cup race for NASCAR Busch Series legend Tommy Houston.

Full results

Failed to qualify
Failed to qualify, withdrew, or driver changes:

Box score

(5) Indicates 5 bonus points added to normal race points scored for leading 1 lap(10) Indicates 10 bonus points added to normal race points scored for leading 1 lap & leading the most laps

Cautions
Cautions: 14 for 70 laps

Lap Leader Breakdown

Standings after the race

References

Southern 500
Southern 500
Southern 500
NASCAR races at Darlington Raceway